Claudio!, is an album by Brazilian trumpeter Claudio Roditi which was recorded in 1985 and released by the Uptown label.

Reception

On AllMusic Scott Yanow states, "The music is mostly quite boppish, with Don Sickler and Roditi contributing arrangements for a notable sextet ... This is still one of his best recordings to date".

Track listing
 "Karioka" (Kenny Dorham) – 5:11
 "Can't Help Lovin' Dat Man" (Jerome Kern, Oscar Hammerstein II) – 6:22
 "Nefertiti" (Wayne Shorter) – 6:33
 "The Eternal Triangle" (Sonny Stitt) – 6:46
 "Lament" (J. J. Johnson) – 6:11
 "My Romance" (Richard Rodgers, Lorenz Hart) – 5:13

Personnel
Claudio Roditi – trumpet, flugelhorn, arranger
Slide Hampton – trombone
Howard Kimbo – tenor saxophone
Mulgrew Miller – piano
Rufus Reid – double bass
Akira Tana – drums
Steve Sacks – synthesizer (tracks 3 & 5)
Don Sickler – arranger

References

Claudio Roditi albums
1985 albums
Uptown Records (jazz) albums
Albums recorded at Van Gelder Studio